Kangxi may refer to:

 Kangxi Emperor (1654-1722), an important ruler from the Chinese Qing Dynasty period
 Kangxi Dictionary, authoritative compilation and cross reference of Chinese characters, used to the present day
 Kangxi radicals, 214 modern Chinese radicals, as organized in the Kangxi dictionary
 Kangxi Dynasty, a Chinese drama TV series
 Kangxi lai le, a talk show in Taiwan
 Kangxi transitional porcelain